Amak Volcano is a basaltic andesite stratovolcano in the Aleutian Islands of Alaska, United States,  from Anchorage. It is located on the eponymous island,  from Frosty Volcano and near the edge of the Alaskan Peninsula's western flank. Only boats are allowed to access the island with a certain permit.

Blocky (dotted with flat blocks of minerals and crystals) lava flows stream from its summit to its flanks. Three historical eruptions have taken place – two within the 18th century, the first from 1700–1710, and the latter in 1796. The earliest prehistoric eruption was believed to have taken place between 3050 and 2050 BCE.

Accessibility 
Cold Bay, the city nearest Amak, is easily accessible by plane. Amak is accessible only by boat; airplanes are not permitted to land on the island. Private boat rides to Amak are available in Cold Bay, but for access to the Aleutian Islands, a permit is required from the United States Fish and Wildlife Service.

Geography and geology 
Amak Island lies in the Bering Sea, north of the main archipelago of the Aleutians.

The United States has the most active volcanoes in the world, many of them geologically young.
In Alaska, at least 50 volcanoes, including those in the Aleutian archipelago, have erupted in historical time.
The state accounts for ~80% of the United States' volcanoes, excluding the seamounts in the area, ~8% of world volcanoes, and most of these are located among the Aleutian Islands. The Aleutian Islands arc serves as the northern boundary of the Pacific Ring of Fire, where tectonic activity generates earthquakes and volcanic eruptions in masses.

The volcano is basaltic-andesitic in composition. The volcanic crater is distinct, and has erupted in historical times, only "blocky" lava flows. Charles Wood and Jürgen Kienle, volcanologists, propose that earlier activity, 4,000–5,000 years ago, consisted primarily of lavas of ethereal (fine) platy and thick andesite. Amak Volcano is unique in that its andesitic lavas, while composed the same as the other Aleutians, contain an abundance of potash. They also could contain more sodium carbonate and rare-earth element deposits than the Aleutian norm. Between Bogoslof, the other Aleutian island north of the main arc, and Amak, Amak's lavas are more alkalic and silicic.

Glaciation took place around the volcano roughly 6700 years BP, carving out U-shaped valleys. At the southwest flank of the island, a crater, likely a maar, can be found amid an alluvial plain.

Eruptive history 
The Amak Volcano has erupted three times in historical times: circa 2550 B.C., from 1700–1710, and in 1796; the first of these events was identified with tephrochronology. Each eruption has been characterized by lava flows, and the two most recent eruptions included a crater eruption.

See also

References

Bibliography

External links
 

Volcanoes of the Aleutian Islands
Volcanoes of Aleutians East Borough, Alaska
Volcanoes of Alaska
Stratovolcanoes of the United States
Holocene stratovolcanoes